The Hereford Hospitals NHS Trust was the main provider of hospital and acute health care services for the English county of Herefordshire and for parts of Wales, which borders the county to the west. The Trust had an annual turnover of around £118 million and employed some 1,800 staff. It was managed by a Trust Board, which was responsible for ensuring that the Trust carries out its requirement to provide health care for the local population effectively, efficiently, economically and in a safe environment.

The Trust provided the following services;

Accident and Emergency Department
A dedicated cancer unit
Day case and routine surgery,  
Emergency in-patient medical care
Maternity services
Outpatient Clinics
Paediatrics
Radiology

The trust merged into Wye Valley NHS Trust in 2001.

See also
 List of NHS trusts

External links
 Hereford Hospitals NHS Trust website

Health in Herefordshire
Defunct NHS trusts